Kansas's 6th Senate district is one of 40 districts in the Kansas Senate. It has been represented by Democrat Pat Pettey since 2013, following her defeat of Democrat-turned-Republican Chris Steineger.

Geography
District 6 is based in southern Kansas City in Wyandotte County and Johnson County, also covering parts of Edwardsville, Merriam, and Overland Park.

The district is located entirely within Kansas's 3rd congressional district, and overlaps with the 24th, 31st, 32nd, 33rd, 36th, and 37th districts of the Kansas House of Representatives. It borders the state of Missouri, located directly to the west of that state's Kansas City.

Recent election results

2020

2016

2012

Federal and statewide results in District 6

References

6
Wyandotte County, Kansas
Johnson County, Kansas